The Streeter–Phelps equation is used in the study of water pollution as a water quality modelling tool. The model describes how dissolved oxygen (DO) decreases in a river or stream along a certain distance by degradation of biochemical oxygen demand (BOD). The equation was derived by H. W. Streeter, a sanitary engineer, and Earle B. Phelps, a consultant for the U.S. Public Health Service, in 1925, based on field data from the Ohio River. The equation is also known as the DO sag equation.

Streeter–Phelps equation 
The Streeter–Phelps equation determines the relation between the dissolved oxygen concentration and the biological oxygen demand over time and is a solution to the linear first order differential equation

This differential equation states that the total change in oxygen deficit (D) is equal to the difference between the two rates of deoxygenation and reaeration at any time.

The Streeter–Phelps equation, assuming a plug-flow stream at steady state is then

where
 is the saturation deficit, which can be derived from the dissolved oxygen concentration at saturation minus the actual dissolved oxygen concentration.  has the dimensions .
 is the initial oxygen demand of organic matter in the water, also called the ultimate BOD (BOD at time t=infinity).
 is the oxygen demand remaining at time t, . 
 is the initial oxygen deficit .
 is the elapsed time, usually .

 lies typically within the range 0.05-0.5  and  lies typically within the range 0.4-1.5 .

The Streeter–Phelps equation is also known as the DO sag equation. This is due to the shape of the graph of the DO over time.

Critical oxygen deficit 
On the DO sag curve a minimum concentration occurs at some point, along a stream. If the Streeter–Phelps equation is differentiated with respect to time, and set equal to zero, the time at which the minimum DO occurs is expressed by

To find the value of the critical oxygen deficit, the Streeter–Phelps equation is combined with the equation above, for the critical time, . Then the minimum dissolved oxygen concentration is

where  is the flow velocity of the stream. This formula is a good approximation as long as the flow can be regarded as a plug flow (turbulent).

Estimation of reaeration rate 
Several estimations of the reaeration rate exist, which generally follow the equation

where
  is a constant.
  is the flow velocity [m/s].
  is the depth [m].
  is a constant.
  is a constant.

The constants depend on the system to which the equation is applied, i.e. the flow velocity and the size of the stream or river. Different values are available in the literature.

The software "International Hydrological Programme" applies the following equation derived on the basis of values used in published literature

where
 .
 is the average flow velocity [m/s].
 is the average depth of flow in the river [m].

Temperature correction 
Both the deoxygenation rate,  and reaeration rate,  can be temperature corrected, following the general formula.

where 
 is the rate at 20 degrees Celsius.
θ is a constant, which differs for the two rates.
 is the actual temperature in the stream in degC.

An increasing temperature has the most impact on the deoxygenation rate, and results in an increased critical deficit, and  decreases. Furthermore, a decreased  concentration occurs with increasing temperature, which leads to a decrease in the DO concentration.

Mixing of rivers
When two streams or rivers merge or water is discharged to a stream it is possible to determine the BOD and DO after mixing assuming steady state conditions and instantaneous mixing.  The two streams are considered as dilutions of each other thus the initial BOD and DO will be 

and

where
 is the initial concentration of BOD in the river downstream of the mixing, also called BOD(0).
 is the background BOD of the concentration in the river .
 is the BOD of the content of the merging river .
 is the initial concentration of the dissolved oxygen in the river downstream of the conjoining point .
 is the background concentration of the dissolved oxygen content in the river .
 is the background concentration of the dissolved oxygen content in the merging river .
 is the flow in the river upstream from the mixing point .
 is the flow in the merging river upstream from the mixing point .

Numerical approach 
Nowadays it is possible to solve the classical Streeter–Phelps equation numerically by use of computers. The differential equations are solved by integration.

History 
In 1925, a study on the phenomena of oxidation and reaeration in the Ohio River in the US was published by the sanitary engineer, Harold Warner Streeter and the consultant, Earle Bernard Phelps (1876–1953). The study was based on data obtained from May 1914 to April 1915 by the United States Public Health Service under supervision of Surg. W.H. Frost.

More complex versions of the Streeter–Phelps model were introduced during the 1960s, where computers made it possible to include further contributions to the oxygen development in streams. At the head of this development were O'Connor (1960) and Thomann (1963). O'Connor added the contributions from photosynthesis, respiration and sediment oxygen demand (SOD). Thomann expanded the Streeter–Phelps model to allow for multi segment systems.

Applications and limitations 

The simple Streeter–Phelps model is based on the assumptions that a single BOD input is distributed evenly at the cross section of a stream or river and that it moves as plug flow with no mixing in the river. Furthermore, only one DO sink (carbonaceous BOD) and one DO source (reaeration) is considered in the classical Streeter–Phelps model. These simplifications will give rise to errors in the model. For example the model does not include BOD removal by sedimentation, that suspended BOD is converted to a dissolved state, that sediment has an oxygen demand and that photosynthesis and respiration will impact the oxygen balance.

Expanded model 
In addition to the oxidation of organic matter and the reaeration process, there are many other processes in a stream which affect the DO. In order to make a more accurate model it is possible to include these factors using an expanded model.

The expanded model is a modification of the traditional model and includes internal sources (reaeration and photosynthesis) and sinks (BOD, background BOD, SOD and respiration) of DO.
It is not always necessary to include all of these parameters. Instead relevant sources and sinks can be summed to yield the overall solution for the particular model.
Parameters in the expanded model can be either measured in the field or estimated theoretically.

Background BOD 
Background BOD or benthic oxygen demand is the diffuse source of BOD represented by the decay of organic matter that has already settled on the bottom. This will give rise to a constant diffuse input thus the change in BOD over time will be
 
where
  is the BOD from organic matter in the water .
  is the background BOD input .

Sedimentation of BOD 
Sedimented BOD does not directly consume oxygen and this should therefore be taken into account. This is done by introducing a rate of BOD removal combined with a rate of oxygen consumption by BOD. Giving a total rate for oxygen removal by BOD 
 
where
The change in BOD over time is described as

where  is the BOD from organic matter in the water .

 is typically in the range of 0.5-5 .

Sediment oxygen demand 

Oxygen can be consumed by organisms in the sediment. This process is referred to as sediment oxygen demand (SOD). Measurement of SOD can be undertaken by measuring the change of oxygen in a box on the sediment (benthic respirometer).

The change in oxygen deficit due to consumption by sediment is described as

where 
  is the depth of the river [m]
  is the SOD 
 D is the saturation deficit .
 is the reaeration rate [].

The range of the SOD is typically in the range of 0.1 – 1  for a natural river with low pollution and 5 – 10  for a river with moderate to heavy pollution.

Nitrification 
Ammonium is oxidized to nitrate under aerobic conditions
NH4+ + 2O2 → NO3− + H2O  + 2H+

Ammonium oxidation can be treated as part of BOD, so that BOD = CBOD + NBOD, where CBOD is the carbonaceous biochemical oxygen demand and NBOD is nitrogenous BOD. Usually CBOD is much higher than the ammonium concentration and thus NBOD often does not need to be considered. The change in oxygen deficit due to oxidation of ammonium is described as

where
 D is the saturation deficit.
 is the nitrification rate .
 is ammonium-nitrogen concentration.

Photosynthesis and respiration 
Photosynthesis and respiration are performed by algae and by macrophytes. Respiration is also performed by bacteria and animals. Assuming steady state (net daily average) the change in deficit will be

where
  is the respiration .
  is the photosynthesis .

Note that BOD only includes respiration of microorganisms e.g. algae and bacteria and not by macrophytes and animals.

Due to the variation of light over time, the variation of the photosynthetic oxygen can be described by a periodical function over time, where time is after sunrise and before sunset

where
  is the photosynthesis at a given time .
  is the daily maximum of the photosynthesis .
  is the fraction of day with sunlight, usually  day.
  is the time at which sun rises .

The range of the daily average value of primary production  is typically 0.5-10 .

See also 
Water pollution
Water quality modelling
Biochemical oxygen demand
Oxygenation (environmental)
Oxygen saturation
Oxygen depletion
Hypoxia (environmental)
Deoxygenation
Water aeration
Photosynthesis
Nitrification
Fick's laws of diffusion
Ohio river
United States Public Health Service

References

External links
O'Connor D. J., 1960, Oxygen Balance of an Estuary, Journal of the Sanitary Engineering Division, ASCE, Vol. 86, No. SA3, Proc. Paper 2472, May, 1960

Thomann R. V.,1963, Mathematical model for dissolved oxygen, Journal of the Sanitary Engineering Division, American Society of Civil Engineers, Volume 89, No. SA5

Environmental engineering
Water and the environment
Water pollution
Mathematics articles needing expert attention